Ivo Karlović and Łukasz Kubot were the defending champions, but Karlović chose not to participate this year and Kubot chose to compete in Stuttgart instead.
Mate Pavić and Michael Venus won the title, defeating Dominic Inglot and Raven Klaasen in the final, 3–6, 6–3, [11–9].

Seeds

Draw

Draw

References
 Main Draw

Ricoh Openandnbsp;- Doubles
2016 Doubles